The Great Leap Forward is a band formed by former Big Flame member Alan Brown, when his previous band split up in 1987. After several releases the project was put on hold in 1990, but revived in 2008 with subsequent album releases.

History
Great Leap Forward is essentially a solo project, although various musicians were added for live performances.  The sound is more melodic and accessible than Brown's earlier band, but still with overtly political lyrics.  After two EPs (which were described by the NME as "conspicuously excellent") and a 12-inch single on Ron Johnson Records, that label's collapse led to a move to Communications Unique for debut album Don't Be Afraid Of Change, which The Guardian described as Brown meeting "the advent of the synthesizer ethic head-on". Manchester publication Up Town described it as "the most definitive Manchester release this year...pop shimmering down urban lanes, sprinkling hard dance diatribes, infectious melodies, and lyrics with substance". Ian Gittins, writing in Melody Maker, described it as "full of wordy thoughts on the state of this nation set to an infectious, chirpy dance beat". Simon Williams, reviewing the album for the NME gave it 8/10, stating "at least half of [it] is damn near astonishing". A 12-inch single, "Heart and Soul", was followed by the LP compilation Season 87-88 which largely comprised tracks from the three Ron Johnson singles, and the CD compilation Great Leap Forward, before Brown put the project on hold in early 1990.  A mini-LP, Tolerance & Respect had been planned for a Spring 1990 release but was shelved.

Stuart Maconie, writing for NME, summed up the band's late 1980s sound: "First there's the jagged guitar melodics, sweet but never tacky. Then there's the ferocious rhythmic drive. But best of all there's the stylish and witty use of found voices...snatches and snippets of speech and propaganda that are integral to the songs."

The Great Leap Forward recorded two sessions for John Peel's BBC Radio 1 show, in May 1987 and January 1988.

James Dean Bradfield included the debut Great Leap Forward EP in his top 10 favourites from the 'C86' era.

In October 2008, Brown revived The Great Leap Forward and released a CD of new material, Finished Unfinished Business, followed in 2012 by a further album This Is Our Decade of Living Cheaply and Getting By.
In Spring 2021, Brown is releasing another album Revolt Against an Age of Plenty on A Turntable Friend Records.

Brown has since played bass in Sarandon., and guitar in a reformed A Witness, although both these bands have since ceased to perform. There are plans for The Great Leap Forward to perform as a band in 2021.

Discography

Albums
Don't Be Afraid Of Change... (1988), Communications Unique
Finished Unfinished Business (2008), Communications Unique
This Is Our Decade Of Living Cheaply And Getting By (2012), Communications Unique
Revolt Against An Age Of Plenty (2021) A Turntable Friend / Communications Unique

Compilations
Season 87–88 (1988), Communications Unique
Great Leap Forward (1990), Communications Unique

Singles, EPs
Controlling The Edges Of Tone (1987), Ron Johnson
A Peck on the Cheek À La Politiqué (1988), Ron Johnson
"Who Works the Weather?" (1988), Ron Johnson
Heart and Soul(1989), Communications Unique

Tracks on other compilations / formats 
Bereavement Of Speech (flexidisc 1987) No Idea fanzine
Friction (flexidisc tbc)tbc
(When It's) Cold In Summer on Commercially Unfriendly (CD, 2005) Gott Discs
My Grandfather's Cluck on C87 (CD, 2016) Cherry Red Records
Who Works The Weather? on C88 (CD, 2017) Cherry Red Records
A Peck On The Cheek À La Politique on Manchester North Of England (CD, 2017), Cherry Red Records

References

External links
 

English indie rock groups
Musical groups from Manchester